Rhigiophyllum is a genus of flowering plants belonging to the family Campanulaceae.

Its native range is South African Republic.

Species:
 Rhigiophyllum squarrosum Hochst.

References

Campanuloideae
Campanulaceae genera